The following is a list of road cars manufactured by Italian sports car manufacturer Ferrari, dating back to the 1950s (Race cars from the late 1940s).

Current models

Models by category

Front-engine V12 2-seats

Ferrari's first road cars ever produced were V12 grand tourers. This type of car was discontinued in 1973 in favour of mid-engined 12-cylinder sports cars, later brought back in 1996 with the 550 Maranello and made ever since.
 1950 166 Inter
 1950 195 Inter
 1951 212 Inter
 1951 212 Export
 1950–1966 America
 1950–1952 340 America
 1952 342 America
 1953–1954 375 America
 1955–1959 410 Superamerica
 1959–1964 400 Superamerica
 1964–1966 500 Superfast
 1952–1964 250
 1953 250 Europa
 1954–1955 250 Europa GT
 1955–1957 250 GT Coupé Boano
 1957–1958 250 GT Coupé Ellena
 1958–1960 250 GT Coupé Pinin Farina
 1956–1963 250 GT Berlinetta ("Tour de France" and SWB)
 1957–1962 250 GT Cabriolet
 1957–1963 250 GT California Spyder
 1962–1964 250 GT Berlinetta Lusso
 1964–1968 275
 1964–1965 275 GTB
 1964–1965 275 GTS
 1966–1968 275 GTB/4
 1963–1968 330
 1966–1968 330 GTC
 1966–1968 330 GTS
 1966–1973 365
 1966–1967 365 California
 1968–1969 365 GTC
 1969–1970 365 GTS
 1968–1973 365 GTB/4 (Daytona)
 1968–1973 365 GTS/4
 1996–2006 550 & 575
 1996–2001 550 Maranello
 2001 550 Barchetta Pininfarina
 2002–2006 575M Maranello
 2005 Superamerica
 2006–2012 599
 2006–2012 599 GTB Fiorano
 2010–2011 599 GTO
 2010 SA Aperta
 2012–2017 F12berlinetta
 2015–2017 F12tdf 
 2017– 812 Superfast
 2019– 812 GTS
 2021– 812 Competizione
 2021– 812 Competizione A

Front-engine V12 2+2

Since 1960 the company has also produced front-engined V12 2+2 cars.

 1959–1963 250 GT/E
 1963–1964 330 America
 1964–1967 330 GT 2+2
 1967–1971 365 GT 2+2
 1971–1972 365 GTC/4
 1972–1989 365 GT4 2+2, 400 and 412
 1972–1976 365 GT4 2+2
 1976–1979 400
 1979–1985 400i
 1985–1989 412
 1992–2003 456
 1992–1997 456
 1998–2003 456M
 2004–2011 612 Scaglietti
 2011–2016 FF
 2016–2020 GTC4Lusso

Front-engine V8 2+2
With the California a new line of V8 front-engined 2+2 convertibles was introduced.
With the GTC4Lusso T a new line of V8 front-engined 2+2 Grand Tourers was introduced.

 2009–2018 California
2009–2014 California
2014–2018 California T
 2017–2020 GTC4Lusso T
 2018–2021 Portofino
 2018–2021 Portofino
 2021– Portofino M
 2019– Roma

Mid-engine Flat-12

From 1973 to 1996 Ferrari produced 180° non-boxer flat 12 mid-engined berlinettas in place of the traditional V12 front-engined grand tourers.

 1973–1984 Berlinetta Boxer
 1973–1976 365 GT4 BB
 1976–1981 512 BB
 1981–1984 512 BBi
 1984–1996 Testarossa
 1984–1992 Testarossa
 1992–1994 512 TR
 1994–1996 F512 M

Mid-engine V6/V8 2-seats

The Dino was the first mid-engined road car designed and produced by Ferrari. This layout would go on to be used in most Ferraris of the 1980s and 1990s. V6 and V8 Ferrari models make up well over half of the marque's total production.

 1967–1974 Dino
 1967–1969 Dino 206 GT
 1969–1974 Dino 246 GT
 1972–1974 Dino 246 GTS
 1975–1985 208/308
 1975–1977 308 GTB (vetroresina)
 1977–1979 308 GTB & GTS
 1980–1981 208 GTB & GTS
 1980–1981 308 GTBi & GTSi
 1982–1985 208 GTB Turbo
 1983–1985 208 GTS Turbo
 1982–1985 308 GTB & GTS Quattrovalvole
 1985–1989 328
 1986–1989 328 GTB & GTS
 1986–1989 GTB & GTS Turbo
 1989–1994 348
 1989–1993 348 TB & TS
 1993–1994 348 GTB, GTS & Spider
 1994–1999 F355
 1994–1999 F355 Berlinetta
 1995–1999 F355 Spider & GTS
 1997–1999 355 F1
 1999–2004 360
 1999–2004 360 Modena & Spider
 2003–2004 360 Challenge Stradale
 2005–2009 F430
 2005–2009 F430 & F430 Spider
 2007–2009 F430 Scuderia
 2008–2009 F430 Scuderia Spider 16M
 2009–2015 458
 2009–2015 458 Italia
 2011–2015 458 Spider
 2013–2015 458 Speciale
 2014–2015 458 Speciale A
 2015–2020 488
 2015–2019 488 GTB & 488 Spider
 2018–2020 488 Pista & 488 Pista Spider
 2019– F8
 2019– F8 Tributo & F8 Spider

Mid-engine V8 2+2

For a time, Ferrari built 2+2 versions of its mid-engined V8 cars. Although they looked quite different from their 2-seat counterparts, both GT4 and Mondial were closely related to the 308 GTB.

 1973–1980 GT4
 1973–1975 Dino 308 GT4
 1976–1980 308 GT4
 1975 Dino 208 GT4
 1976–1980 208 GT4
 1980–1993 Mondial
 1980–1981 Mondial 8
 1982–1985 Mondial Quattrovalvole
 1983–1985 Mondial Quattrovalvole Cabriolet
 1985–1989 3.2 Mondial & 3.2 Mondial Cabriolet
 1989–1993 Mondial T & Mondial T Cabriolet

Mid-engine V6 Hybrid
PHEV (Plug-in Hybrid Electric Vehicle)
 2020– 296
 2020– 296 GTB & 296 GTS

Mid-engine V8 Hybrid 
PHEV (Plug-in Hybrid Electric Vehicle)
 2020– SF90 Stradale
 2020– SF90 Stradale & SF90 Spider

Icona 
The cars mark the start of a new lineage of models called the "Icona" series, a program aimed at creating special cars inspired by classic Ferrari models, all to be produced in limited series.
 2019– Monza SP1 and SP2
 2022– Daytona SP3

Halo Cars

The pinnacle of the company's road cars are supercars produced in limited numbers; 288 GTO was initially designed for racing homologation.
 1984–1985 288 GTO
 1987–1992 F40
 1995–1997 F50
 1996 F50 GT
 2002–2004 Enzo Ferrari
 2013–2016 LaFerrari
 2016–2018 LaFerrari Aperta

One-off & Few-off

 1952 Ferrari 225 Inter
 1954 Ferrari 375 MM "Ingrid Bergman"
 1956 Ferrari 250 GT Pinin Farina Coupé Speciale
 1969 Ferrari 365 GT NART Spider 'Grintosa'
 1971 Ferrari 3Z Spider
 1971 Ferrari 365 GTB/4 Michelotti NART Spider
 1975 Ferrari 365 GTB/4 Shooting Brake
 1987 Ferrari PPG Pace Car
 1988 Ferrari F90
 1995 Ferrari FX
 1996 Ferrari F50 Bolide
 2006 Ferrari P4/5
 2006 Ferrari Zagato 575 GTZ
 2008 Ferrari SP1 (note: this car is not the Ferrari Monza SP1) 
 2009 Ferrari P540 Superfast Aperta
 2011 Ferrari Superamerica 45
 2012 Ferrari SP12 EC
 2013 Ferrari SP30 Arya
 2013 Ferrari SP FFX
 2014 Ferrari F12 TRS
 2014 Ferrari SP America
 2014 Ferrari F60 America
 2015 Ferrari Sergio
 2016  Ferrari 458 MM Speciale
 2016 Ferrari SP275 RW Competizione
 2017 Ferrari J50
 2018 Ferrari SP38 Deborah
 2018 Ferrari SP3JC

Concept

 1965 Dino Berlinetta Speciale (Pininfarina)
 1966 Dino Berlinetta GT (Pininfarina)
 1966 Ferrari 365 P Berlinetta Speciale (Pininfarina)
 1967 Dino Berlinetta Competizione (Pininfarina)
 1968 Ferrari 250 P5 Berlinetta Speciale (Pininfarina)
 1968 Ferrari P6 (Pininfarina)
 1969 Ferrari Sigma Grand Prix (Pininfarina)
 1969 Ferrari 512 S Berlinetta Speciale (Pininfarina)
 1970 Ferrari Modulo (Pininfarina)
 1980 Ferrari Pinin (Pininfarina)
 1987 Ferrari 408 4RM (Ferrari)
 1989 Ferrari Mythos (Pininfarina)
 1989 Colani Ferrari Testa d'Oro (Luigi Colani)
 1993 Ferrari FZ93 (Zagato)
 2000 Ferrari Rossa (Pininfarina)
 2005 Ferrari GG50 (Giorgetto Giugiaro)
 2005 Ferrari Ascari (Istituto Europeo di Design)
 2010 Ferrari Millechili (University of Modena and Reggio Emilia, faculty of Mechanical Engineering / Ferrari)
 2013 Pininfarina Sergio (Pininfarina)

See also
 List of Ferrari competition cars
 List of Ferrari engines

References

External links
Ferrari Past Models on auto.ferrari.com

Ferrari
Ferrari road cars, List of